Isanthrene incendiaria is a moth of the subfamily Arctiinae. It was described by Jacob Hübner in 1813. It is found in Rio de Janeiro, Brazil.

References

 

Euchromiina
Moths described in 1813